Adrian Kleinbergen (born 1961) is a Canadian artist, born in Edmonton, Alberta.  Along with drawing and painting, he does jewelry design and manufacture, sculpture, caricature, writing, costuming, and even magic. He started in comics in 1987, penciling, inking and coloring Starstone and Darkewood for Aircel Publishing in Ottawa, Ontario, Canada. He contributed art work to the unpublished v3 of 'Genesis' a Role-Playing game in 1991. He ran his own publishing company, Ground Zero Graphics, which published The Shadowalker Chronicles in 1991 (Starstone, Darkewood, and The Shadowalker Chronicles were created and written by Gordon Derry of Ottawa, Ontario, Canada). Kleinbergen was the primary artist and a columnist for the national magic magazine, The Servante. He was one of the original artists for On Spec and a contributor to Neo-opsis magazines, doing both covers and interior art.

Kleinbergen has also worked as a professional comics inker for a variety of magazines and artists and has displayed and sold artwork in a number of venues and galleries.

As of 2018, he has written three novels (Return to the Great White Space, When Falls the Hammer, and Hammer and Fire) and is working on a fourth, called "Hammer and Shield."

External links

Bookstore of A. Kleinbergen http://www.blurb.ca/user/Frohickey?profile_preview=true
 A variety of sculpture art by A. Kleinbergen
 Kleinbergen's page on the Epilogue Science-fiction and Fantasy Art Website
 Kleinbergen's work on the Deviant Art Site.

1961 births
Living people
20th-century Canadian painters
Canadian male painters
21st-century Canadian painters
Artists from Edmonton
20th-century Canadian male artists
21st-century Canadian male artists